Dollar Comics was a line of DC Comics comic book publications issued from 1977 to 1983 and revived in 2019. The 1977-1983 line included the titles The Superman Family, House of Mystery, G.I. Combat, World's Finest Comics, Batman Family, and Adventure Comics; as well as the series of specials with the umbrella title of DC Special Series. The 1977-1983 Dollar Comics were notable for costing $1, having 64 pages, and being advertising-free. The 2019 revival consists of full-issue one-shot reprints of key DC issues.

History

1977-1983
According to then-DC publisher Jenette Kahn, comics' price-per-page value had been declining since the "Golden Age". When superhero comics debuted in the late 1930s, they featured 64 pages of art for 10¢. As the decades passed, comparable publications liked Time and Life raised their prices, while comics stayed at 10 cents and reduced their page-count. Finally in 1962, National Periodical Publications/DC raised its price to 12¢, a 20% increase. Comparable magazines, in contrast, were by then 3.5-to-5 times their original price. By 1977, even though the typical price of a comic book was 35¢, it still lagged far behind its magazine competition, thus decreasing its appeal for newsvendors (which at that point — before the generalized 1980s shift to direct market distribution — was still the dominant retailing location for comics). Thus, the idea for Dollar Comics was born.

Writing for the Silver Bullet Comic Books website, John Wells detailed Dollar Comics' history:

Most Dollar Comics titles began as traditional format books and expanded to the Dollar Comic format. All-Out War and Time Warp were short lived series which were published entirely as Dollar Comics. Several anniversary issues such as Action Comics #500 and The Flash #300 were also in the format as were the DC annuals for 1982 and 1983.

1977-1983 Dollar Comics titles 
 Action Comics #500
 Adventure Comics #459-466
 All-Out War #1-6
 All-Star Squadron Annual #1-2
 Batman Annual #8
 Batman Family #17-20
 DC Comics Presents Annual #1-2
 DC Special Series #1, 5, 9, 11, 13, 15-17, 20-22
 Detective Comics #481-495
 The Flash #300
 G.I. Combat #201-259
 Green Lantern #150
 House of Mystery #251-259
 Justice League of America Annual #1
 Legion of Super-Heroes #294
 Legion of Super-Heroes Annual #1-2
 New Teen Titans Annual #1-2
 The Saga of the Swamp Thing Annual #1
 Sgt. Rock Annual #2-3
 Superman Annual #9
 The Superman Family #182-222
 Superman III Movie Special #1
 Time Warp #1-5
 The Unexpected #189-195
 The Warlord Annual #1-2
 World's Finest Comics #244-282

2019- 
In 2019, DC revived the Dollar Comics line as a weekly series of one-shot reprints of key issues priced at $1, beginning with Detective Comics #854 -- the first comic to feature a solo adventure of the modern Batwoman.

2019 revival issues
Title is followed by scheduled or actual publication date:
 Dollar Comics: Detective Comics #854 (September 4, 2019)
 Dollar Comics: Batman #608 (September 11, 2019)
 Dollar Comics: Harley Quinn (Volume 2) #1 (September 18, 2019)
 Dollar Comics: Crisis on Infinite Earths #1 (September 25, 2019)
 Dollar Comics: The Joker #1 (October 2, 2019)
 Dollar Comics: Watchmen #1 (October 9, 2019)
 Dollar Comics: Batman #497 (October 16, 2019)
 Dollar Comics: Swamp Thing #1 (October 23, 2019)
 Dollar Comics: Superman (Volume 2) #75 (October 30, 2019)
 Dollar Comics: Flashpoint (Volume 2) #1 (November 6, 2019)
 Dollar Comics: Blackest Night #1 (November 13, 2019)
 Dollar Comics: Luthor #1 (November 20, 2019)
 Dollar Comics: Infinite Crisis #1 (November 27, 2019)
 Dollar Comics: Birds of Prey #1 (December 4, 2019)
 Dollar Comics: Tales of the Teen Titans Annual #3 (December 11, 2019)
 Dollar Comics: The Flash (Volume 2) #164 (December 11, 2019)
 Dollar Comics: Batman #613 (January 1, 2020)
 Dollar Comics: The Brave and the Bold #197 (January 8, 2020)
 Dollar Comics: The Batman Adventures #12 (January 15, 2020)
 Dollar Comics: Batman/The Huntress: Cry for Blood #1 (January 22, 2020)
 Dollar Comics: Detective Comics #554 (January 29, 2020)
 Dollar Comics: Batman #386 (February 5, 2020)
 Dollar Comics: Batman: Shadow of the Bat #1 (February 5, 2020)  
 Dollar Comics: Batman #567 (February 12, 2020)
 Dollar Comics: Green Lantern: Rebirth #1 (February 12, 2020)
 Dollar Comics: The Flash: Rebirth #1 (February 19, 2020)
 Dollar Comics: The New Teen titans #2 (February 19, 2020)
 Dollar Comics: Amethyst #1 (February 26, 2020) 
 Dollar Comics: Flash #1 (February 26, 2020)
 Dollar Comics: JLA: Year One #1 (March 4, 2020)
 Dollar Comics: Swamp Thing #57 (March 4, 2020)
 Dollar Comics: Batman #428 (March 11, 2020)
 Dollar Comics: Robin #1 (March 11, 2020)
 Dollar Comics: Justice League (1987) #1 (March 18, 2020)
 Dollar Comics: JLA #1 (March 18, 2020)
 Dollar Comics: Justice League (2011) #1 (March 25, 2020)
 Dollar Comics: Justice League of America #1 (March 25, 2020)
 Dollar Comics: Batman (2013) #13 (April 1, 2020)
 Dollar Comics: Green Lantern #1 (April 1, 2020)
 Dollar Comics: Batman #663 (April 8, 2020)
 Dollar Comics: Catwoman (2002) #1 (April 8, 2020)
 Dollar Comics: Catwoman (2011) #1 (April 15, 2020)
 Dollar Comics: Checkmate #1 (April 22, 2020)
 Dollar Comics: Detective Comics #826 (April 29, 2020)
 Dollar Comics: Batman #450 (April 29, 2020)
 Dollar Comics: Stars and S.T.R.I.P.E. #1 (May 6, 2020)
 Dollar Comics: DARK NIGHTS: METAL #1 (May 13, 2020)
 Dollar Comics: MANHUNTER #1 (May 13, 2020)
 Dollar Comics: Green Lantern #29 (May 20, 2020) 
 Dollar Comics: Wonder Woman #212 (May 20, 2020)
 Dollar Comics: Wonder Woman #206 (May 27, 2020)
 Dollar Comics: Legion of Super-Heroes #1 (1989) (June 10, 2020)
 Dollar Comics: Saga of the Swamp Thing #1 (June 27, 2020)

References

DC Comics titles
Comics formats